Lee Brendan Martin (born 9 September 1968) is an English former professional footballer. He played as a goalkeeper for many teams in the north of England.

He graduated from the University of Salford's Physiotherapy degree in 2002  and was the physiotherapist at his home-town club, Huddersfield Town between 2003 and 2008. He left on 4 July 2008, "by mutual consent", to start up his own physiotherapy business. He was replaced at the Galpharm Stadium by the ex-Accrington Stanley physiotherapist Ian Liversedge.

He was appointed as Physiotherapist by Tranmere Rovers in 2010.

References

External links

1968 births
Living people
Footballers from Huddersfield
English footballers
Association football goalkeepers
Huddersfield Town A.F.C. players
Huddersfield Town A.F.C. non-playing staff
Blackpool F.C. players
Bradford City A.F.C. players
Rochdale A.F.C. players
Halifax Town A.F.C. players
Macclesfield Town F.C. players
English Football League players
Alumni of the University of Salford
Association football physiotherapists